Pleuroacanthitidae is a small family of Lower Jurassic ammonoids that combines some characters  of the Lytoceratina, Phylloceratina, and earliest Ammonitida, as well as special characters of its own.  It is subdivided (Arkell et al., 1957) into two subfamilies, each represented by a single genus, the Pleuroacanthitinae containing Pleuroacanthites and the Analytoceratinae containing Analytoceras.

References

 W.J Arkell et al 1957. Mesozoic Ammonoidea, Treatise on Invertebrate Paleontology, Part L Ammonoidea, p. L192-193

Ammonitida families
Lytoceratina
Early Jurassic first appearances
Early Jurassic extinctions